De Pietro is a surname. Notable people with the surname include:

 (born 1957), Italian politician
Javier De Pietro, Argentinian actor
Michele De Pietro (1884–1967), Italian politician and lawyer
 (1844–1934), Italian Catholic bishop

DePietro
Joseph DePietro (1914–1999), American bantamweight weightlifter

Italian-language surnames
Surnames from given names